Reuben J. "Rooster" Cogburn is a fictional character who first appeared in the 1968 Charles Portis novel True Grit.

Fictional character biography 

Reuben Cogburn was born on July 15, 1825. Cogburn was a veteran of the American Civil War who served under Confederate guerrilla leader William Quantrill, where Cogburn lost his eye. He was married first to an Illinois woman who left him to return to her first husband after bearing Cogburn a single, extremely clumsy son, Horace, (of whom Cogburn says in, "He never liked me anyway"). Cogburn is described as a "fearless, one-eyed United States Marshal who never knew a dry day in his life." He was "the toughest marshal" working the Indian Territory on behalf of Judge Isaac Parker, the real-life judge of the United States District Court for the Western District of Arkansas (having criminal jurisdiction in the Indian Territory, as the bailiff repeatedly announces in both films). When Cogburn goes to court in "Rooster Cogburn," it shows that Cogburn shot a total of 64 men in eight years, killing 60 (by the film's end, it was 70 shot, and 66 killed), all of whom he claimed to have killed in self-defense, in the line of duty, or fleeing justice.

In the 1969 film, Cogburn helped a headstrong 14-year-old girl named Mattie Ross (Kim Darby), along with Texas Ranger LaBoeuf (Glen Campbell), to track down Tom Chaney (Jeff Corey), the man who drunkenly killed her father. In the sequel, he teamed up with elderly spinster Eula Goodnight (Katharine Hepburn) and an Indian boy named Wolf while on the trail of the desperado, Hawk (Richard Jordan), who had stolen a shipment of nitroglycerin from the United States Army and killed family members of both Goodnight and Wolf. Cogburn lived in Fort Smith, Arkansas, in the back of a Chinese dry-goods store, along with the proprietor, his friend and gambling buddy Chen Lee, and an orange tabby cat named after Confederate General Sterling Price for his entire life as a marshal.

In the 2010 film, while Cogburn demonstrated a ruthless attitude towards the criminals and fugitives he pursued, he was generally very fair with Mattie and was shown to have a distaste for what he viewed as unnecessary cruelty. When LaBoeuf is birching Mattie for her refusal to return to Fort Smith, Cogburn demands that he stop and drew his gun in a threat to make LaBoeuf stop. Later in the film, when Cogburn and Mattie witnessed two children caning a mule with sharpened sticks, Cogburn quickly intervened, cutting the mule loose and roughly throwing the two children onto the ground in retaliation. After Mattie was snakebitten, he rode through the night, holding her, in order to get her medical care. When the horse collapsed, he mercy-killed it with his revolver and then carried her a long distance in his arms to get her to a doctor, both saving her life and proving he really had the true grit Mattie thought he did.

Cogburn's relationship with LaBoeuf was strained throughout the film, with the two arguing frequently. Cogburn often made light of the Texas Rangers, much to LaBoeuf's outrage, and irritatedly criticized LaBoeuf's tendency to talk long-windedly. Likewise, LaBoeuf patronized Cogburn for being a hopeless drunk who routinely relents to Mattie's stubbornness. Their greatest point of contention came during an argument about their military service during the American Civil War, during which Cogburn ended their agreement of splitting the reward on Tom Chaney when they brought him back to Texas when LaBoeuf insulted Capt Quantrill. He did, however, thank LaBoeuf for saving his life when "Lucky" Ned Pepper was about to kill him and said he was in debt before leaving with the snakebitten Mattie and promising to send help back.

In both True Grit films, Cogburn confessed to having robbed something after the war before becoming a marshal, a bank in his youth in the 2010 film, and a federal paymaster in the 1969 film. He spoke admiringly of Quantrill, with whom he served during the Civil War. Twenty-five years after the Tom Chaney hunt, Maddie received a note from the Marshal with a flyer enclosed, saying Cogburn was traveling with a Wild West show and inviting her to come see him. However, Cogburn died three days before she arrived while the show was still in Jonesboro, Arkansas. He was buried in a Memphis, Tennessee, Confederate cemetery. When Mattie arrived in Memphis and learned of his death, she had his body removed from her family plot in Yell County, Arkansas and visited it over the years. His gravestone shows his full name to be Reuben Cogburn.

Adaptations

The novel was adapted into a 1969 film, True Grit]], and from that a 1975 sequel entitled [[Rooster Cogburn (film)|Rooster Cogburn was also produced, with Katharine Hepburn and a script loosely based on The African Queen set in the American frontier.  The character was also featured in a 1978 made-for-television sequel entitled True Grit: A Further Adventure starring Warren Oates as Cogburn. The Coen brothers released a new film version of the novel in 2010. In the 1969 and 1975 theatrical releases, Cogburn was portrayed by John Wayne. Unusually for Wayne, who usually portrayed more or less straitlaced heroes, Cogburn is portrayed as a curmudgeonly antihero behaviorally similar to Wallace Beery's performances. The 2010 film features Jeff Bridges as Cogburn and Matt Damon as the comical Texas Ranger, LaBoeuf. John Wayne won the Academy Award for Best Actor for his role as Cogburn in the 1969 film. On January 24, 2011, Bridges was nominated for the same award for his portrayal of Cogburn.

See also
 List of Academy Award records
 Revisionist Western

References

True Grit
Characters in American novels of the 20th century
Fictional American Civil War veterans
Fictional characters missing an eye
Fictional Marshals Service personnel
Literary characters introduced in 1968
Western (genre) gunfighters
Western (genre) peace officers